Hank Williams First Nation is a 2004 film directed by Aaron James Sorensen. It is Sorensen's first feature film.

The film stars Gordon Tootoosis, Jimmy Herman (who were both on North of 60), Stacy Da Silva, Bernard Starlight, and Colin VanLoon.

Plot
The film follows the story of a seventy-five-year-old Cree tribesman named Martin Fox who has been reading too many tabloids, and begins to believe that Elvis Presley and Princess Diana are still alive after their alleged deaths. From this he begins to wonder if his hero Hank Williams is not still alive as well. Before Fox's death, and joined by his younger brother and teenage nephew, he commits to making a Greyhound bus trip to Nashville, Tennessee to find out more about the country music legend and if he is truly deceased or still living.

Williams is actually buried in Montgomery, Alabama.

Reception
Fenando F. Croce called the film a "big-heart slice-of-life" with a unique trajectory and environment.

Awards and nominations
Premiering in competition at the American Film Institute's AFIfest in 2004, the film went on to win several awards at US festivals.

Box office
Hank Williams First Nation was the 3rd highest grossing Canadian (English) film at the Canadian box office in 2005. In 2006, the film was adapted into a 6-episode TV series for Canadian broadcaster APTN. It was shot in Peace River, Alberta and Utah.

Home media
The film was released in Canada in February 2005.

References

External links
 
 

2004 films
Canadian comedy films
Aboriginal Peoples Television Network original programming
First Nations films
2000s English-language films
2000s Canadian films
First Nations television series